The Turkish Men's Volleyball League, officially called the Efe League (Turkish: Efeler Ligi), is the highest professional men's volleyball league in Turkey. It is run by the Turkish Volleyball Federation. Founded in 1970, the league is considered one of the top national leagues in European volleyball, as its clubs have made significant success in European competitions. 

The league succeeded the former Turkish Volleyball Championship, which was held from 1948 to 1970.

2020–21 season

Champions

 1970–71 Galatasaray
 1971–72 İETT
 1972–73 İETT
 1973–74 İETT
 1974–75 Muhafızgücü
 1975–76 Eczacıbaşı
 1976–77 Boronkay
 1977–78 Eczacıbaşı
 1978–79 Eczacıbaşı
 1979–80 Eczacıbaşı
 1980–81 Eczacıbaşı
 1981–82 Eczacıbaşı
 1982–83 Eczacıbaşı
 1983–84 Eczacıbaşı
 1984–85 Eczacıbaşı
 1985–86 Eczacıbaşı
 1986–87 Galatasaray
 1987–88 Galatasaray
 1988–89 Galatasaray
 1989–90 Eczacıbaşı
 1990–91 Eczacıbaşı
 1991–92 Halkbank
 1992–93 Halkbank
 1993–94 Halkbank
 1994–95 Halkbank
 1995–96 Halkbank
 1996–97 NETAŞ
 1997–98 NETAŞ
 1998–99 NETAŞ
 1999–00 Arçelik
 2000–01 Arçelik
 2001–02 Erdemir
 2002–03 Arçelik
 2003–04 Erdemir
 2004–05 Erdemir
 2005–06 Arkas
 2006–07 Arkas
 2007–08 Fenerbahçe
 2008–09 İstanbul BBSK
 2009–10 Fenerbahçe
 2010–11 Fenerbahçe
 2011–12 Fenerbahçe
 2012–13 Arkas
 2013–14 Halkbank
 2014–15 Arkas
 2015–16 Halkbank
 2016–17 Halkbank
 2017–18 Halkbank
 2018–19 Fenerbahçe
 2019–20 Canceled due to the COVID-19 pandemic in Turkey
 2020–21 Ziraat Bankası
 2021–22 Ziraat Bankası

Source:

Performance by club

Sponsorship
 2016–17: Amway – Turkish Airlines – PTT – Vestel – Acıbadem Healthcare Group

See also
Men's:
Turkish Men's Volleyball League
Turkish Men's Volleyball Cup
Turkish Men's Volleyball Super Cup
Women's:
Turkish Women's Volleyball League
Turkish Women's Volleyball Cup
Turkish Women's Volleyball Super Cup

References

External links
 
 Turkish Volleyball Federation

Turkey
Mens
Sports leagues established in 1970
Volleyball
Professional sports leagues in Turkey